Denis Anthony Brian Butler, 9th  Earl of Lanesborough (28 October 1918 – 21 December 1998), was an Anglo-Irish aristocrat. Lord Lanesborough also held the titles 10th Viscount Lanesborough and 12th Baron Newtown-Butler.

Family
Lord Lanesborough, when he was still styled as Baron Newtown-Butler, married Bettyne Ione Everard, daughter of Sir William Lindsay Everard, on 20 December 1939 and had two daughters: The Honourable Georgina Ione Butler (15 August 1941 – 28 December 1947) and Lady Denyne Butler (born 23 February 1945). Lanesborough divorced his first wife in 1950 and married his secretary Patricia Julia Meston, daughter of F.W. Meston, M.C., in 1995. Lanesborough died on 27 December 1998 and his second wife Patrica Julia, Countess of Lanesborough, died on 5 March 2015.

Swithland Estate
However, the death duties entailed in the inheritance resulted in the sale of the majority of the estate.

The family's Irish seat had been Lanesborough Lodge, located on the Lanesborough Demesne at Quivvy, a townland just outside Belturbet, in County Cavan. The lodge and demesne were located on a small peninsula on the shores of Upper Lough Erne, directly opposite County Fermanagh. Lanesborough Lodge was burned to the ground in the early 1920s. The Butler family sold off the demesne shortly afterwards.

Career 
Lord Lanesborough's hobby was 600-foot model railways, a replica of the Fort William-to-Carlisle line, with 300 pieces of rolling stocks which had to be dismantled with to reduce death duties. Lanesborough eventually applied to British Rail for employment driving trains, which was declined; however, he was successful with his application to sell cars. After the death of his mother, The Dowager Countess of Lanesborough, he sold Swithland Hall and moved to Kegworth Lodge before health reasons resulted in his moving to Scotland.

Arms

References

1918 births
1998 deaths
Leicestershire
People from the Borough of Charnwood
British people of Irish descent
People educated at Stowe School
English landowners
British landowners
20th-century British people
9
20th-century British businesspeople